Bryce Canyon Airport  is a public-use airport located four miles (6 km) north of Bryce Canyon, in Garfield County, Utah, United States. It is owned by Garfield County.

The airport is near Bryce Canyon National Park and the Grand Staircase–Escalante National Monument.

Facilities and aircraft 
For the 12-month period ending December 31, 2004, the airport had 3,132 aircraft operations: 57% general aviation, 26% air taxi and 17% scheduled commercial.

Charter airlines and destinations 
 Air Grand Canyon (Prescott, South Rim Grand Canyon)
 Air Vegas (Las Vegas)
 Talon Air (Las Vegas)
 Grand Canyon Airlines
 King Air (Henderson)
 Westwind (Deer Valley, Page, Phoenix)

Historic significance
The Garfield County Airport Hangar is significant as an unusual example of a log hangar. The hangar was built of local ponderosa pine by the Works Progress Administration in 1936. The hangar's gabled roof is supported sawn wood trusses spanning . The trusses are expressed on the outside and infilled with half-rounds of log, giving a half timbered effect. The hangar and airport were built by Garfield County and the WPA with the aim of attracting tourism to Bryce Canyon National Park, which had been designated in 1928.

The timber used in the hangar shows the marks of the borers that infested the trees, which were harvested as part of a program to remove beetle-killed trees. The hangar is unique in its adaptation of local construction techniques to accommodate a new transportation technology.

Bryce Canyon Airport was listed on the National Register of Historic Places in 1978.

Incidents 
United Airlines Flight 608 a DC-6 (NC37510) was on a flight from Los Angeles to Chicago when it crashed at 12:29 pm on October 24, 1947 about 1.5 miles southeast of Bryce Canyon Airport, killing all 5 crew members and 47 passengers on board.

On October 6, 2000 American Airlines flight 2821 departed Denver International Airport bound for Los Angeles International Airport. The airliner was immediately redirected to the Bryce Canyon airport in southwestern Utah. The single runway airport only handles small prop planes daily, but was actually built to handle larger aircraft in case of emergency for the long stretch flights between Denver and Las Vegas. The American Airlines flight 2821 and the 75 people on board landed safely at 8:45 A.M.

References

External links 

 More about Bryce Canyon Airport
  at the National Park Service's NRHP database

Airports in Utah
Airports on the National Register of Historic Places
Buildings and structures in Garfield County, Utah
Government buildings on the National Register of Historic Places in Utah
Rustic architecture in Utah
Transportation in Garfield County, Utah
Works Progress Administration in Utah
National Register of Historic Places in Garfield County, Utah
Transportation buildings and structures on the National Register of Historic Places in Utah